West Ham Corporation Tramways operated a tramway service in the County Borough of West Ham between 1901 and 1933.

History

West Ham Corporation took over the North Metropolitan Tramways horse drawn services in stages starting on 1 July 1903. A programme of modernisation and electrification was undertaken, and the first electric services ran on 27 February 1904.

The company built up a fleet of 134 tramcars in a chocolate and cream livery.

The company experimented with trolley buses as early as 1912. At the annual conference of the Municipal Tramways Association from 25 to 27 September 1912, an Austrian Cédès-Stoll was the first trolleybus to carry passengers in London, along Greengate Street.

Closure

The services were taken over by London Passenger Transport Board on 1 July 1933.

References

Trams in London
Transport in the London Borough of Newham
Defunct transport authorities in London
1903 establishments in England
1933 disestablishments in England
British companies disestablished in 1933
British companies established in 1903